A Fersommling (plural, Fersommlinge) (also spelled Versammling or Fersammling) is a Pennsylvania Dutch social event in which food is served, speeches are made, and one or more g'spiel (plays or skits) are performed for entertainment. "A high degree of theatricality and ceremony is involved, especially in the groundhog lodges: pledging loyalty to the lodge and the groundhog, listening to a weather report, singing patriotic songs in Deitsch, and ending every meeting by asking God to allow them to keep their way of life and their merriment."  as described by William W. Donner. Among these traditions is the singing of the German folk song "Schnitzelbank"  and the patriotic "My Country, 'Tis of Thee", in Pennsylvania German, as translated by John Birmelin.  " there is continual creativity, as current events are incorporated into the versammling performances, speeches, and skits."

Fersommlinge are typically attended by the Fancy Dutch, as opposed to the "Plain sects" of the Amish, Brethren and Mennonites. The term literally means "a congregation," not in the sense of a group of church-goers, but as a "social gathering of people." Fersommlinge are not religious functions, though many churches and church groups hosted the events and used them to raise money. The Pennsylvania German dialect is the only language spoken at the event, and those who speak English pay a penalty, usually in the form of a nickel, dime or quarter, per word spoken, put into a bowl in the center of the table.

The first Fersommling was held by Dr. John I. Woodruff of Susquehanna University in 1933.  Shortly afterward, on March 13, 1933, a second was held in Allentown, Pennsylvania at the home of William S. Troxell, who wrote a daily column on Pennsylvania German culture for the Allentown Morning Call under the pseudonym "Pumpernickle Bill."  The purpose of the gathering was to plan the formation of the first Grundsow (Groundhog) Lodge. On the next Groundhog Day, February 2, 1934, the first Fersommling of Grundsow Lodge Nummer Ains an Da Lechaw (Number One on the Lehigh) took place in Northampton, Pennsylvania.

Fersommlinge continue to be held throughout eastern Pennsylvania as a means of preserving the Pennsylvania German dialect and culture. For example, the Berks County Fersommling, which started in 1937, annually attracts more than 700 participants, most of whom are of Pennsylvania German ancestry.

Since 1997, some of the texts presented at Fersommlinge are also published in the Pennsylvania German newspaper Hiwwe wie Driwwe. Current Fersommling and Grundsau lodge information is kept up to date at groundhoglodge.org and the Pennsylvania German Society

"The versammlinge which started as a way to celebrate Pennsylvania German heritage and ethnicity became over time part of that heritage and ethnicity"

References

Pennsylvania culture
Social events
Pennsylvania Dutch culture